Earendel may refer to:
 Ēarendel, an Anglo-Saxon mythological figure, the Morning Star, or Rising Star, or Dawn
 Eärendel, original spelling of Eärendil, a fictional character from J.R.R. Tolkien's Legendarium 
 Earendel (star), a star, announced as the most distant then known individual star in 2022
 "Earendel" (song), a 2015 song by 'Sirenia' off the album The Seventh Life Path

See also

 Song of Eärendil, a poem by J.R.R. Tolkien

 Morning Star (disambiguation)
 Rising Star (disambiguation)
 Dawn (disambiguation)
 Arendelle, a fictional realm where Disney's Frozen films take place